The Central Organization for a Durable Peace was established at The Hague, The Netherlands, in April 1915. Its members were individuals from ten European states, Germany, Belgium, England, Austria-Hungary, Italy, Holland, Norway, Sweden, Denmark, Switzerland, and the United States. They called for a "new diplomacy", willing to accept military sanctions against aggressive countries.

The Organization was dissolved after the Treaty of Versailles. Involved American peace leaders included Fannie Fern Andrews, Emily Greene Balch and William Isaac Hull.

See also
 Peace Palace
 Tablet to The Hague, a 1919 letter to the organization from ʻAbdu'l-Bahá, the head of the Baháʼí Faith

References

 Swarthmore College Peace Collection: Central Organization for a Durable Peace
 TriCollege Libraries: Central Organisation for a Durable Peace Collected Records

Defunct international non-governmental organizations
Peace organisations based in the Netherlands
1915 establishments in the Netherlands
Organisations based in The Hague